The Bearsden Choir (previously known as Bearsden Burgh Choir) is a choir of 120 mixed adult voices based in Glasgow, Scotland. It was formed in 1968 and performs both sacred and secular classical choral works. The singer Jamie MacDougall is its Honorary President.

The Herald described it as one of Scotland's leading choirs.

History
The choir was founded in 1968 by Harry MacGill, at the time organist of New Kilpatrick Church, with the initial objective giving a Christmas performance of Handel's Messiah. This was so successful that it was decided to keep the choir going on a permanent basis. Over the years, it expanded its programming and has become known for its "imaginative repertoire" and "high standards of performance".  It has twice reached the finals of BBC2's Sainsbury's Choir of the year competition, won the four top awards for mixed choirs at the 1983 Blackpool Music Festival and in 2001 won the Glasgow Orpheus Choir Trophy at the Glasgow Music Festival.

The choir now performs at least three major concerts each year with a professional orchestra and soloists. It has been featured on television and radio, notably with the BBC Scottish Symphony Orchestra performing three contrasting versions of the Te Deum by Berlioz, Bruckner and Dvořák. The choir has done several Songs of Praise recordings, including the live broadcast at Glamis for the service of remembrance of Queen Elizabeth The Queen Mother.

As part of its Silver jubilee celebrations, the late Lord Menuhin conducted the choir in the first performance of Handel's Messiah in the Glasgow Royal Concert Hall.

In April 2000 the choir gave an unabridged account of St Matthew Passion in Glasgow Cathedral to mark the 250th anniversary of Bach's death. In 2003 the Choir presented a number of major concerts in Kelvingrove Art Gallery and Museum in aid of the Kelvingrove Refurbishment Appeal. It also played a leading role in the Gallery's opening concert in 2006. Earlier that year the Berlioz Te Deum, performed by the Bearsden and Paisley Abbey choirs, provided a test of the restored acoustics in the Glasgow City Halls with the venue's first choral concert since its renovation.

The choir has commissioned a variety of new choral works from contemporary composers. These have included The Lamb by Edward Harper, Harmony of Angels by Jennifer Margaret Barker, Ballade Pour Prier Nostre Dame by Martin Dalby and There was a lad by Glyn Bragg. In 2008, its 40th anniversary year, the choir commissioned a new work by Oliver Iredale Searle. The piece, 23.VII.32, was performed in both its forms, once with full orchestra and once with the reduced setting of piano, organ and percussion. The choir has also performed  David Fanshawe's African Sanctus, Herbert Howells's Hymnus Paradisi, and Elgar's Dream of Gerontius, the only performance of the work in Scotland in 2012.

On 16 December 2018, the Bearsden Choir celebrated its 50th anniversary with a performance of Handel's Messiah at the Glasgow City Halls, Scotland and this was followed by a performance of the Bach B minor Mass in May 2019.

Along with all other mass musical events, the summer part of the 2019-2020 season was cancelled due to the global Covid-19 pandemic. The choir continued to hold 'virtual' rehearsals every week and produced works online which are available through our Youtube channel and via the website

We have now started our first 'normal' season since the pandemic. We rehearse at the Wellington Church which is on University Avenue, Glasgow every Wednesday at 7:30pm

Organization
The Bearsden Choir has been a registered charity since 1980 and receives grants from the East Dunbartonshire Arts Council. The choir's singers are amateurs, chosen on an audition basis, augmented by professional soloists for major concerts. Its principal staff have included:
Musical Director

The musical director is Andrew Nunn, under whom the choir has expanded its size, repertoire and reputation.  
Accompanist 
Christopher Nickol (Nickol is also Director of Music at New Kilpatrick Church, Bearsden)
Honorary President 
Jamie MacDougall (Scottish tenor and TV personality)

Recordings
Tam o' Shanter and Songs by Robert Burns. Bill McCue, Bearsden Burgh Choir, conducted by Renton Thomson. (The choral version of Robert Burns's "Tam o' Shanter" was composed by George MacIlwham.) Lismor RBLP 1790 (1979)
Bearsden Choir Sings Choral Favourites. Produced by Acclaim Productions (2013)

References

External links 
 

Scottish choirs
Musical groups from Glasgow
Musical groups established in 1968